Rathayibacter is a genus of bacteria of the order Actinomycetales which are gram-positive soil organisms.

References

Microbacteriaceae
Soil biology
Bacteria genera